Cliffside station is a railway station located in Cliffside, British Columbia, on the east side of Shawnigan Lake. The station was a flag stop on Via Rail's Dayliner service. The service has been indefinitely suspended since 2011.

References 

Via Rail stations in British Columbia
Southern Vancouver Island
Disused railway stations in Canada